František Vladimír Lorenc (24 December 1872 – 24 May 1957), known in Portuguese as Francisco Valdomiro Lorenz, was a Czech-born polyglot and philosopher born in Zbyslav (nowadays part of the Czech Republic). He was one of the first Esperantists in the world, and was able to communicate in over 100 different languages. Lorenz was persecuted by the Austro-Hungarian monarchy due to his involvement with Esperanto, which was associated with socialist revolutionary movements in the region, and he subsequently moved to Brazil as a political refugee in 1891. In Brazil, he lived in Rio de Janeiro at first, and then in Rio Grande do Sul (Southern Brazil). Lorenz published over 36 books in 40 languages and was one of the most prominent promoters of Esperanto movement ever in Brazil. He died in Dom Feliciano (Brazil) in 1957.

References

Budo Esperanta de Valença - Francisco Valdomiro Lorenz - In Portuguese

Centro Educacional à Distância (CED) Notícias - In Portuguese

External links
 

1872 births
1957 deaths
Brazilian Esperantists
Brazilian people of Czech descent